Jerry Dean Hinsley (born April 9, 1945) is an American former professional baseball player, a right-handed pitcher whose career extended from 1963 through 1971.

He spent the entire 1963 season on the roster of the Pirates' Rookie-level Appalachian League affiliate but did not appear in any games. He was then selected by the Mets in the Rule 5 draft on December 2. Hinsley began the 1964 season on the Mets' roster and made his debut in professional baseball in the Majors on April 18 against his old organization, the Pirates, in relief. He gave up five hits and two earned runs (coming from a two-run triple by future Hall of Famer Roberto Clemente) in two innings.  He made his first start on May 10 against the St. Louis Cardinals at Shea Stadium and lasted 2⅔ innings, yielding four runs and absorbing his first MLB loss.  He appeared in seven more games before being sent to the Triple-A International League for the balance of 1964.  Apart from a two-game trial at the end of the 1967 season, Hinsley spent the remainder of his career in minor league baseball.

His Major League totals included 11 games played, with 27 hits and 16 earned runs given up in 20⅓ innings pitched. He issued 11 bases on balls and struck out 14.

References

External links

1945 births
Living people
Baseball players from Oklahoma
Baseball players from New Mexico
Buffalo Bisons (minor league) players
Jacksonville Suns players
Major League Baseball pitchers
New York Mets players
Memphis Blues players
People from Hugo, Oklahoma
People from Las Cruces, New Mexico
Portland Beavers players
Savannah Indians players
Syracuse Chiefs players
Wichita Aeros players
Williamsport Mets players